Alina Eremia (born 15 December 1993 in Buftea) is a Romanian singer, TV personality, and former member of the LaLa band, who represented Romania in the Junior Eurovision Song Contest 2005 with the song Țurai. She plays Ioana in the teenage sitcom series Pariu cu viața. From 2014, she participated at the Romanian version of Dancing with the stars on Antena 1 and she was in the jury of Next Star.

She also worked for Disney Romania as a Voice actress, dubbing the singing voice of Pocahontas in Pocahontas (Romanian dubbing from 2008) and Pocahontas II: Journey to a New World (Romanian dubbing from 2009), and both speaking and singing voices of Belle in Beauty and the Beast, Beauty and the Beast: The Enchanted Christmas and Belle's Magical World (Romanian dubbing from 2010).

Alina was a member of Miracol for over six years. During that time, she also studied piano at the School of Music and Fine Arts, Bucharest.

She is one of the most recognised singers of Romania and her song  "It was a madness" was listed as one of the most popular songs of the year in 2015.

In 2016 Alina parodied her own song "A fost o nebunie" together with Andrei Ciobanu and Sergiu Floroaia.

Discography 
Studio albums

360 (2017)
Déjà Vu (2021)

EP

Show Must Go On (Live) (2021)

Filmography

Film

Television

Awards and nominations

References

External links 

 AlinaEremia.ro Official website
[ Alina Eremia] discography at Allmusic

1993 births
English-language singers from Romania
Living people
People from Buftea
Global Records artists
Romanian child singers
Romanian pianists
Romanian women pianists
Romanian women pop singers
21st-century Romanian singers
21st-century Romanian women singers
21st-century pianists
Junior Eurovision Song Contest entrants
21st-century women pianists